The Sha'ar HaNegev Regional Council (Mo'atza Azorit Sha'ar HaNegev, lit. Gate of the Negev Regional Council), is a regional council in the north-western Negev, in Israel's Southern District. The Regional Council's territory lies midway between Beersheba and Ashkelon, bounded on the west by the Gaza Strip. The eastern border abuts Bnei Shimon.  The city of Sderot forms an enclave within Sha'ar HaNegev.

The region's population is over 6,000, and covers an area of over 45,000 acres (approx. 180 km2 or 70 sq. mi.).  The average elevation is approximately 180 m (495 ft.) above sea level.

Sha'ar HaNegev Regional Council is in a sister city relationship with San Diego, California, in the United States of America, and has a close working relationship with the Jewish Federation of San Diego County.

Settlements
There are 11 communities, including 10 kibbutzim and one moshav.

Kibbutzim
Bror Hayil
Dorot
Erez
Gevim
Kfar Aza
Mefalsim
Nahal Oz
Nir Am
Or HaNer
Ruhama
Moshav
Yakhini
Educational institutions
Ibim
Historical sites
Shikmim

References

External links

 

 
Regional councils in Israel
1950 establishments in Israel